Alphonse Joseph Georges (August 15, 1875 in Allier, Montluçon – April 24, 1951 in Paris) was a French army officer. He was commander in chief of the North East Front in 1939 and 1940. Opposing the plan by supreme commander Maurice Gamelin to move the best Allied forces into the Low Countries, he was overruled. Georges tried to allow as much initiative to his subordinates as possible to improve operational flexibility.

Early career
Georges entered the École Spéciale Militaire de Saint-Cyr and graduated third in his class in 1897. He served in French Algeria with a tirailleur regiment.

First World War 
He served in the French Army during the First World War and was seriously wounded while he was leading his battalion in 1914. He was then assigned to the general staff of the army, where he remained for the rest of the war.

Interwar Period 
In 1918 Georges served under General Ferdinand Foch as operations chief. He was also chief of staff under Marshal Henri-Philippe Pétain in French Morocco during the 1920–1926 Rif War and as a division commander in Algeria (1928–1932).

Georges was appointed to the Supreme War Council in November 1932. Based in Paris, he witnessed the assassination of French Foreign Minister Louis Barthou and King Alexander I of Yugoslavia in Marseilles on 9 October 1934. Seriously wounded, Georges had a long recovery but was expected to succeed General Maxime Weygand as head of the French Army in 1935. The Prime Minister, however, thought he was too right-wing and appointed General Gamelin instead.

World War II 
Georges was appointed as Gamelin's deputy, but they had a mutually-hostile relationship. On the outbreak of the Second World War in September 1939, Georges became commander of all French field armies. Gamelin and Georges assured Daladier that France had the greatest army in the world and were shocked when the Allied front was broken through at Sedan by the Wehrmacht. According to the memoirs of Captain Andre Beaufre, after the front was broken, the feeling was rife in Georges's headquarters staff that the battle with the Germans had been lost, with Beaufre himself witnessing Georges breaking into tears. On 19 May 1940, both Gamelin and Georges were both dismissed, and General Weygand returned as head of the French Army.

Once Marshal Pétain took power after the fall of France and the collapse of the French Third Republic, Georges refused to play any significant role in the new Vichy France government. Winston Churchill wanted Georges to become commander of French forces in Algeria, Morocco, and Tunisia after the invasion of North Africa in November 1942. In that aim, Churchill was unsuccessful. Franklin Roosevelt insisted for the post go to General Henri Giraud instead.

In January 1943, Giraud and General Charles de Gaulle became co-presidents of the French Committee of National Liberation (CFLN). Georges was appointed minister without portfolio, but well before the end of the year, he, like Giraud, was ousted by de Gaulle. Thereafter he took no part in politics. He died in 1951.

References

External links

Generals of World War II

People from Montluçon
1875 births
1951 deaths
École Spéciale Militaire de Saint-Cyr alumni
French generals
French military personnel of World War I
French Army generals of World War II
Lycée Lakanal alumni
Grand Croix of the Légion d'honneur
Officers of the Order of Agricultural Merit
Recipients of the Croix de Guerre 1914–1918 (France)
Recipients of the Croix de guerre (Belgium)
Recipients of the Croix de guerre des théâtres d'opérations extérieures
Companions of the Distinguished Service Order
Honorary Knights Commander of the Order of the Bath
Recipients of the Order of the Sacred Treasure